Thyatira tama is a moth in the family Drepanidae. It was described by Schaus in 1933. It is found in Colombia.

References

Moths described in 1933
Thyatirinae